Storö-Bockö-Lökaö Nature Reserve (also known as Möjaskärgården or Möja archipelago) is a nature reserve in Stockholm County in Sweden.

The nature reserve consists of more than 150 islands of different sizes on the border between the outer and middle parts of Stockholm archipelago. The vegetation on the outer islands is dominated by birch, while the other islands are dominated by pine. The undergrowth is generally sparse, apart from in the occasional small valley, where vegetation can be relatively lush with oak trees and other deciduous trees. Several of the islands also contain areas of swamp forest. The bird-life is rich, with species such as velvet scoter, tufted duck, common eider, ruddy turnstone, skua and black guillemot found here.

References

External links

Nature reserves in Sweden
Stockholm archipelago
Geography of Stockholm County
Tourist attractions in Stockholm County
Protected areas established in 1972
1972 establishments in Sweden